Thomas Bluett (16901749) was a British judge in Annapolis, Maryland.

Bluett gained lasting renown by the encounter with an African slave, Ayuba Suleiman Diallo, in 1731. While in jail in Annapolis, Ayuba was visited by Thomas Bluett. Thomas became impressed with him and, through another slave acting as interpreter, wrote Ayuba's biography "Some Memoirs of the Life of Job, the Son of Solomon, the High Priest of Boonda in Africa; Who was a Slave About Two Years in Maryland; and Afterwards Being Brought to England, was Set Free, and Sent to His Native Land in the Year 1734", which was published in London 1734. Bluett died in 1749.

External links
The Bluett Family
Some Memoirs of the Life of Job
Some Memoirs of the Life of Job (Bibliotheca Augustana)

1690s births
1749 deaths
British colonial judges in the Americas
People of colonial Maryland